Armadale Hospital is a general public hospital in Armadale, in Perth's south-eastern suburbs. The hospital, which includes an emergency department with 47 patient spaces, is located on the Armadale Health Service campus. The campus also includes Armadale's Community Health Service, Mental Health Service, and Aged Care and Rehabilitation Service.

History

Before a hospital was established in Armadale, anyone in the area requiring medical attention beyond what the local doctor could provide had to travel into Perth. In 1924, the government made available an annual subsidy of £50 to encourage the establishment of a private hospital.

In 1946, the Armadale Kelmscott Road Board planned to purchase the private hospital, and open a public hospital at the site. An incorporated society would be formed to own and run the premises. In March 1946, the hospital building was taken over as a district war memorial hospital. It was initially operated under a lease while funds were being raised to buy the building.

The hospital was extended with a new block, including an operating theatre, that was opened by The Minister for Housing, Mr. Wild, on 8 February 1953. It was subsidized by a government grant of £4000.

A major redevelopment occurred between 1999 and 2001. In February 2005 the hospital took over the adjacent private facilities, previously known as the Galliers Private Hospital and the Galliers Specialist Centre. In 2007, the emergency department was expanded to twice its previous size.

References

Hospitals in Perth, Western Australia
Armadale, Western Australia